Quezon City Pride Council (QCPC) is a council created for the purpose of enforcing LGBT rights and gender-based policies and programs for LGBT individuals in Quezon City. Formed in March 2013, it is the first of its kind in the Philippines. The Quezon City Pride Council (QCPC) was constituted to oversee the integration of all city programs and projects for the LGBT (lesbian, gays, bisexual, and transgender) community. 

QCPC created through an office order during the term of Mayor Herbert Bautista, was formally launched on March 25, 2013 to highlight the city government’s continuing support for the implementation and enforcement of gender-based policies, programs and activities. The Council is composed of notable individuals that promotes and advocates LGBT rights from different industry and profession; also part of the Council are members of the local government.

Projects

Shortly after its creation in March 2013, QCPC launched the World Pride Festival in August 2013 to culminate Pride and promote LGBT awareness. The month-long event was planned to kick off by November 2013 with series of weekly activities that included a Clean-up Drive, an Arts Exhibit, an LGBT Summit, the InQCity Independent Film Festival and would culminate with the World Pride March slated December 7 of that year. The event however was cancelled "to pave its way to the victims of Typhoon Haiyan" that devastated the Central Philippines November the same year. The InQCity Independent Film Festival however was pushed through and was staged at Trinoma Mall for a week.

Health
In Partnership with the City Health Office, the Pride Council successfully conducted the HIV/AIDS Seminar and Orientation to the 142 barangays of Quezon City. The initial project implementation was initiated last April – June of this year. The second phase of the project is scheduled to commence on August 27 until November 19 of this year within the 6 Legislative Districts of Quezon City.

Awareness
QCPC extends its arms to organizations within Metro Manila who wished to stage any advocacy within Quezon City. In partnership with the Office of the Vice Mayor and Office of the Mayor, along with the lead convenor Association of Transgender People in the Philippines and other LGBT organizations in the country, the International Day Against Homophobia and Transphobia was successfully staged at the Quezon Memorial Circle with more than 300 participants from mostly transgender men and women.

The Quezon City Pride Council (QCPC) participated at the National Conference and Meeting on Sexual Orientation, Gender Identity and Expression (SOGIE) and Human Immunodeficiency Virus Infection/Acquired Immunodeficiency Syndrome (HIV/AIDS) training in Butuan City last August 7–10, 2014.

The team was headed by Director Soxie Topacio, QCPC chairperson, Erwin Joselito Ulanday, executive director, Jeffklein Glodove, Director for Marketing and Communications & Director Nicolas De Ocampo, IPF Festival Director. The 4-man team was part of the 70-man delegation of the recently concluded confabulation, which consisted various notable people including the incumbent Vice Mayor of Quezon City Joey Belmonte, the QCPC Team, Atty. Marilyn Pintor of Commission on Human Rights (CHR), Perci Cendana of National Youth Commission and Alvin Cloyd Dakis of the National Anti-Poverty Council.

QCPC Team presented on the second day the composition, legalities, mission and vision and core values of the Pride Council spearheaded by the Chairperson Direk Soxie Topacio. Erwin Joselito Ulanday also discussed the projects and advocacies of the Pride Council since its conception and Jeffklein Glodove promoted the upcoming events highlighting the QCPC Pride March and International Pink Festival.

Environment
In partnership with Environment Protection and Waste Management Department, LGBT organizations and private individuals, a clean-up drive dubbed as “Ilog mo, Irog Ko, Buhay Ko” was held at Barangay Masambong, District 1, Quezon City in celebration with the Environment Month of June.

Upcoming events

In celebration with the Jubilee Anniversary of Quezon City, QCPC will be staging the QC International Pink Film Festival that will promote awareness, education and LGBT rights and is also dubbed as the largest LGBT Film Festival in Asia.

The event will be held at Trinoma Cinemas and will feature more than 45 film entries from ASEAN countries, Germany, France, United States and local films.

The festival will focus on information dissemination and will encourage the young film makers to put their LGBT visions and aspirations though motion picture.

The festival will also highlight a seminar/forum on major LGBT topics and will be attended by notable international and local speakers on topics of LGBT employment, rights, discrimination, human development and social engagement.

Opening the festival will be the world premiere of documentary filmmaker Nick Deocampo's new film, "#pinQCity." It tackles the struggles of an LGBT community living in one of the biggest cities in the country. 
 
Joining "#pinQCity" are other local queer film classics and new releases alike such as Gil Portes’ "Markova,"Auraeus Solito’s "Ang Pagdadalaga ni Maximo Oliveros," Joel Lamangan’s "Lihis," Jose Altarejos’ "Unfriend," Sigrid Andrea Bernardo’s "Ang Huling Cha-cha ni Anita," and Alvin Yapan’s "Gaydar."  
 
Award-winning international films will also be screened during the Quezon City International Pink Film Festival. The lineup includes Cannes Film Festival grand prize winner "La Vie d’Adele" (Blue is the Warmest Color), the German film "Freier Fall," and the American documentary "Before We Know It." Other foreign films to be shown are from Sweden, Australia, Japan, Indonesia, Malaysia, Cambodia, and Vietnam. 
 
The festival will be held from December 9 to 16 at Trinoma Mall.

In solidarity with Quezon City’s 75th founding anniversary and 20th anniversary of Pride March in the Philippines, the QCPC Pride March will be staged on December 13, 2014, at the Quezon Memorial Circle. The QC Pride March is chaired by Ging Cristobal.

The event will highlight the Pride Parade from Tomas Morato to QC Circle and will feature the ‘LGBT Awards Night’ that will give recognition and citations to notable individuals in government and private sectors that helped promote the advancement of LGBT movement in Quezon City and the country.

LGBT organizations within Quezon City and Metro Manila along with regional and foreign delegates will be attending the Pride Parade.

References

Local government in Quezon City
Organizations based in Metro Manila
LGBT organizations in the Philippines
Politics of Quezon City